Shyamacharya or Kalakacharya I (c.247 BC - 151 BC) was a Jain monk.

Life
Shyamacharya or Kalakacharya I lived from c. 247 BC to 151 BC. He composed Prajnapaana Sutra, an encyclopaedia of Jain tenets.

Citations

Sources

 

Indian Jain monks